Genden is a surname. Notable people with the surname include:

 Eric M. Genden, American otolaryngologist
 Peljidiin Genden (1892–1937), prominent political leader of the Mongolian People's Republic

See also 
 Labrang Monastery in Mongolia, formally Genden Shédrup Dargyé Trashi Gyésu khyilwé Ling
 Gendün